Kudos may refer to:

Arts and media
 Kudos (computer game), a life simulation game produced by Positech Games
 Kudos (production company), a UK-based film and television production company
 Kudos, a fictional currency used by the Dwellers in The Algebraist

Other uses
 Kudos (computer program), a vocational-counseling computer program
 Kudos (granola bar), a brand of chocolate-covered cereal bar
 Kudos, praise and honor received for an achievement

See also
 Cudos (disambiguation)
 Kudus (disambiguation)